William Painter (November 20, 1838 – July 15, 1906) was an American mechanical engineer, inventor and the founder of Crown Holdings, Inc., a Fortune 500 company. He most notably invented the crown cork bottle cap and bottle opener.

Early life and career
Painter was born in 1838 in Triadelphia, then a mill town in Montgomery County, Maryland to Dr. Edward Painter and Louisa Gilpin Painter. He moved to Baltimore, Maryland in 1865 to begin a career as a foreman at the Murrill & Keizer's machine shop. He worked with manufacturers to develop a universal neck for all glass bottles and started the Crown Cork & Seal Company of Baltimore in 1892 to manufacture caps that could be used to seal the universal necks.

Patents
Painter patented 85 inventions, including the common bottle cap, the bottle opener, a machine for crowning bottles, a paper-folding machine, a safety ejection seat for passenger trains, and also a machine for detecting counterfeit currency. 

He was inducted to the National Inventors Hall of Fame in 2006.

References

External links
William Painter and his father, Dr. Edward Painter: sketches and reminiscences by Painter's son, Orrin Chalfant Painter (1914).
Painter's obituary in the August 1906 edition of The Western Brewer.
Crown Cork Bottle Cap - U.S. Patent #468258.
Capped Bottle Opener - U.S. Patent #514200.

19th-century American inventors
People from Baltimore
1838 births
1906 deaths
Burials at Druid Ridge Cemetery
Inventors from Maryland